Panagiotis Kafkis (alternate spelling: Panayiotis) (Greek: Παναγιώτης Καυκής; born May 8, 1980 in Athens, Greece) is a Greek former professional basketball player and coach. During his playing career, at a height of 1.97 m (6 ft 5  in) tall, he played at the point guard and shooting guard positions.

Professional career
After playing with the youth teams of Aetos Kallitheas, Kafkis started his pro career with Ilysiakos in 1998. In his pro career, Kafkis played with some of the following clubs: Makedonikos, Apollon Patras, Panionios, and Olympiacos. After last playing in 2018, Kafkis announced he was switching from playing to coaching in 2019.

National team career
Kafkis won the silver medal at the 2005 Mediterranean Games, while playing with Greece's under-26 national team.

Coaching career
After he retired from playing professional basketball, Kafkis began his coaching career in 2019, when he became the head coach of the Greek club Ilysiakos.

References

External links
Euroleague.net Profile
FIBA Europe Profile
Eurobasket.com Profile
Greek Basket League Profile 
Hellenic Federation Profile 

1980 births
Living people
Apollon Patras B.C. players
Competitors at the 2005 Mediterranean Games
Doukas B.C. players
Greek basketball coaches
Greek men's basketball players
Ilysiakos B.C. coaches
Ilysiakos B.C. players
Kolossos Rodou B.C. players
Makedonikos B.C. players
Mediterranean Games medalists in basketball
Mediterranean Games silver medalists for Greece
Nea Kifissia B.C. players
Olympiacos B.C. players
Pagrati B.C. players
Panionios B.C. players
P.A.O.K. BC players
Peristeri B.C. players
Point guards
Shooting guards
Footballers from Athens
Greek footballers